The Simsapa tree is mentioned in ancient Buddhist discourses traditionally believed to have been delivered 2,500 years ago. The tree has been identified as either Dalbergia sissoo, a rosewood tree common to India and southeast Asia, or Amherstia nobilis, another South Asian tree, of the family Caesalpiniaceae.

Buddhist scriptural references
In Buddhism's Pali Canon, there is a discourse entitled, "The Simsapa Grove" (Samyutta Nikaya 56.31).  This discourse is described as having been delivered by the Buddha to monks while dwelling beneath a simsapa grove in the city of Kosambi.  In this discourse, the Buddha compares a few simsapa leaves in his hand with the number of simsapa leaves overhead in the grove to illustrate what he teaches (in particular, the Four Noble Truths) and what he does not teach (things unrelated to the holy life).

Elsewhere in the Pali Canon, simsapa groves are mentioned in the "Payasi Sutta" (Digha Nikaya 23) and in the "Hatthaka Discourse" (Anguttara Nikaya 3.34).

See also
 Ashoka tree

Notes

Sources
 Bodhi, Bhikkhu (trans., ed.) (2000). The Connected Discourses of the Buddha: A Translation of the Samyutta Nikaya. Boston: Wisdom Publications. .
 Rhys Davids, T.W. & William Stede (eds.) (1921-5). The Pali Text Society’s Pali–English Dictionary. Chipstead: Pali Text Society. A general on-line search engine for the PED is available at http://dsal.uchicago.edu/dictionaries/pali/.
 Thanissaro Bhikkhu (trans.) (1997). Simsapa Sutta: The Simsapa Leaves (SN 56.31). Retrieved 16 Nov 2008 from "Access to Insight" at http://www.accesstoinsight.org/tipitaka/sn/sn56/sn56.031.than.html.
 Thanissaro Bhikkhu (trans.) (1999). Hatthaka Sutta: To Hatthaka (on Sleeping Well in the Cold Forest) (excerpt) (AN 3.34). Retrieved 16 Nov 2008 from "Access to Insight" at http://www.accesstoinsight.org/tipitaka/an/an03/an03.034.than.html.
 Walshe, Maurice O'C. (trans.) (1985). Samyutta Nikaya: An Anthology (Part III) (Wheel Nos. 318-321). Kandy: Buddhist Publication Society.  Retrieved 16 Nov 2008 from "Access to Insight" (2007) at http://www.accesstoinsight.org/lib/authors/walshe/wheel318.html.
 Walshe, Maurice (1987/1995). The Long Discourses of the Buddha: A Translation of the Digha Nikaya. Boston: Wisdom Publications. .

Trees in Buddhism
Plant common names